James Loomis may refer to:

 James Chaffee Loomis (1807–1877), American lawyer and politician
 James H. Loomis (1823–1914), American merchant, banker and politician